St. James Episcopal Church, Mill Creek, also known as St. James Church or St. James Church, Stanton, is an historic Episcopal church located at 2106 St. James Church Road, in Stanton, Mill Creek Hundred, New Castle County near Wilmington, Delaware.

As Europeans settled in Delaware, a log structure was erected near this location circa 1703. Mill Creek Hundred was split off from Christiana Hundred (as were nearby White Clay Hundred and Pencader Hundred) in 1710, and four years later James Robinson bought 110 acres, of which he donated 10 to build a church for the community. The building was finished two years later, and the first minister was George Ross, who later became father-in-law of the flagmaker Betsy Ross.  After the American Revolution, although few Anglican clergy remained in Delaware, a layman from this church attended the first General Convention that founded the Episcopal Church, along with Rev. Charles Henry Wharton (a converted Catholic and rector of nearby Immanuel Church, New Castle) and two other layman from that parish. In 1820, the wood-frame church burned, and was rebuilt in stone during the next three years.

Bishop William White consecrated the current church in 1821, and it was added to the National Register of Historic Places as St. James Church in 1973. A rounded apsidal chancel projects from the north wall, and the interior still has white box pews and a balcony on three sides. The oldest burial in the surrounding cemetery is of John Armstrong, who died in 1726. The cemetery also contains the graves of several identified veterans of the American Revolution (and a memorial concerning lost veterans' graves).

See also

List of Registered Historic Places in New Castle County, Delaware

References

External links

St. James Mill Creek website

Churches on the National Register of Historic Places in Delaware
Churches completed in 1823
Episcopal church buildings in Delaware
Historic American Buildings Survey in Delaware
19th-century Episcopal church buildings
National Register of Historic Places in New Castle County, Delaware